Daniel Cornel Marivate was a South African writer and composer who wrote the first Xitsonga novel Sasavona.

Works

Books

 Sasavona
 David Livingstone
 Xiloyiloyi
 Buku ya Swivuriso

Music

See also
 Charles Daniel Marivate - Medical doctor

Further reading
Solani Samson Mthombeni: The man, the village and his acoustic guitar

References

1897 births
1989 deaths
South African male composers
South African male writers
20th-century male musicians